The 2019 UEC European Track Championships was the tenth edition of the elite UEC European Track Championships in track cycling and took place at the Omnisport Apeldoorn in Apeldoorn, Netherlands, between 16 and 20 October 2019. The event was organised by the European Cycling Union. All European champions were awarded the UEC European Champion jersey which may be worn by the champion throughout the year when competing in the same event at other competitions.

Schedule

Events

 Competitors named in italics only participated in rounds prior to the final.
 These events are not contested in the Olympics.
 In the Olympics, these events are contested within the omnium only.

Medal table

References

External links
Official website
UEC
Results
Results book

 
UEC European Track Championships
European Track Championships
2019 UEC
International cycle races hosted by the Netherlands
October 2019 sports events in Europe
2019 UEC European Track Championships